Hedley Beare  (28 November 19325 September 2010) was an Australian educator, administrator and author. He led the creation of the Northern Territory and ACT education systems. Beare wrote, co-wrote or edited 18 books and contributed 40 book chapters and hundreds of journal articles.  He delivered the 1986 Buntine Oration titled "Shared Meanings About Education: The Economic Paradigm Considered."

He was appointed a Member of the Order of Australia in 2009.

References

1932 births
2010 deaths
20th-century Australian educators
Members of the Order of Australia
Members of the Northern Territory Legislative Council